

Christian Hansen (10 April 1885  – 7 August 1972) was a German general in the Wehrmacht of Nazi Germany during World War II who commanded the 16th Army. He was a recipient of the Knight's Cross of the Iron Cross. Hansen retired from the Wehrmacht on 31 December 1944 on medical grounds. He died in 1972.

Awards

 Knight's Cross of the Iron Cross on 3 August 1941 as General der Artillerie and commander of X. Armeekorps.

References
Citations

Bibliography

 
 

1885 births
1972 deaths
People from the Province of Schleswig-Holstein
People from Schleswig, Schleswig-Holstein
German Army generals of World War II
Generals of Artillery (Wehrmacht)
German Army personnel of World War I
Prussian Army personnel
Recipients of the Gold German Cross
Recipients of the Knight's Cross of the Iron Cross
Recipients of the clasp to the Iron Cross, 1st class
Reichswehr personnel
Military personnel from Schleswig-Holstein